LROC may refer to:
 LRoc, songwriter and producer
 Lunar Reconnaissance Orbiter Camera, cameras on a NASA robotic spacecraft orbiting the Moon